Myurellopsis kilburni is a species of sea snail, a marine gastropod mollusc in the family Terebridae, the auger snails.

Etymology
The species name kilburni honors the South African malacologist Richard Kilburn.

Description
These shells are slender and show an ivory color with fulvous-brown or lavender-brown markings.

Distribution and habitat
This species can be found from South Africa to French Polynesia and Hawaii, at depth of 1 to 110 m.

References

 Bratcher T. & Cernohorsky W.O. (1987). Living terebras of the world. A monograph of the recent Terebridae of the world. American Malacologists, Melbourne, Florida & Burlington, Massachusetts. 240pp
 Drivas, J. & M. Jay (1988). Coquillages de La Réunion et de l'île Maurice
 Terryn Y. (2007). Terebridae: A Collectors Guide. Conchbooks & NaturalArt. 59pp + plates.
 Severns M. (2011) Shells of the Hawaiian Islands - The Sea Shells. Conchbooks, Hackenheim. 564 pp.

External links
 

Terebridae
Molluscs of the Indian Ocean
Molluscs of the Pacific Ocean
Fauna of the Red Sea
Gastropods described in 1965